Anthony Bean Community Theater & Acting School (ABCT) was established in the spring of 2000. , the company was New Orleans' only African-American community theatre. Founder Anthony Bean established the theater and drama school with the goal of representing those who "have no voice".

Theater 
The Anthony Bean Community Theater (ABCT) was established in Spring 2000. It is housed in a former Catholic church. Actor Jeremiah Craft identified the theater in 2020 as "the heart of theater at the intersection of people of color, the city [New Orleans], and the state [Louisiana].”

Acting school 
ABCT offers day and evening classes in dramatic arts, including acting, stage design, and theater  management. During the summer, ABCT, in conjunction with the New Orleans Recreation Department Commission, has provided a nine-week summer youth workshop for young actors in the New Orleans area. The ages for the summer program range from 7–17 years old.

See also
Theatre in Louisiana

References

External links
 http://www.nola.com/arts/index.ssf/2016/02/making_drama_building_lives_th.html
 http://www.bestofneworleans.com/blogofneworleans/archives/2016/02/01/anthony-bean-theater-buys-st-raymond-catholic-church
 http://www.nola.com/arts/index.ssf/2015/12/anthony_bean_community_theater_5.html

African-American theatre companies
Performing groups established in 2000
Regional theatre in the United States
Theatre companies in Louisiana
Theatres in New Orleans